Tebebu Behonegn (born 25 July 1974) is an Ethiopian boxer. He competed in the men's flyweight event at the 1996 Summer Olympics.

References

1974 births
Living people
Ethiopian male boxers
Olympic boxers of Ethiopia
Boxers at the 1996 Summer Olympics
Place of birth missing (living people)
Flyweight boxers